Petr Mareš (born 17 January 1991) is a Czech football defender, who currently plays for FK RFS in Latvia.

References

External links

1991 births
Living people
Czech footballers
Association football defenders
Czech First League players
SK Slavia Prague players
FC Hlučín players
FC Sellier & Bellot Vlašim players
FK Viktoria Žižkov players
FC Hradec Králové players
FK Mladá Boleslav players
FK Teplice players
People from Planá
Czech Republic youth international footballers
Czech Republic international footballers
Sportspeople from the Plzeň Region